is a public high school located in Mishimachūō, Shikokuchūō, Ehime, Shikoku, Japan opened in 1923 as the .

Overview
Opened in 1923, Ehime Prefectural Mishima High School has produced a large number of alumni. The School was the inspiration for the 2010 Japanese movie Shodo Girls.

Notable alumni
 Syukuro Manabe, Nobel Laureate (physics)
 Shinya Ishikawa, professional wrestler.

Sister school
 Killara High School (Sydney, Australia)

References

External links

Ehime Prefectural Mishima High School Official website (Japanese)

Ehime Prefecture
Education in Ehime Prefecture
Shikokuchūō
High schools in Ehime Prefecture
Schools in Ehime Prefecture
Educational institutions established in 1923
1923 establishments in Japan
Registered Monuments of Japan